Anepsiozomus is a genus of hubbardiid short-tailed whipscorpions, first described by Mark Harvey in 2001.

Species 
, the World Schizomida Catalog accepts the following two species:

 Anepsiozomus harteni Harvey, 2006 – Yemen (Socotra)
 Anepsiozomus sobrinus Harvey, 2001 – Seychelles

References 

Schizomida genera